Ngaitlang Dhar is a member of Meghalaya Legislative Assembly from Umroi constituency. He won the seat in 2013 assembly elections but lost his seat in the 2018 Meghalaya assembly elections.

References

External links
Ngaitlang Dhar affidavit

Living people
Meghalaya MLAs 2013–2018
National People's Party (India) politicians
Year of birth missing (living people)
Indian National Congress politicians